Ferry Pass is a census-designated place (CDP) in Escambia County, Florida. It is a community in Pensacola, and is located north of Pensacola City Limits. As of the 2010 United States Census, the population was 28,921. The University of West Florida, located in Ferry Pass, is the only university located in the Pensacola Metropolitan Area.

Geography
Ferry Pass is located at  (30.512395, -87.201491).

The boundaries of the CDP include Greenbriar Boulevard to the north, Ensley to the west, the city of Pensacola to the south, and Escambia Bay to the east.

Demographics

As of the census of 2000, there were 27,176 people, 11,569 households, and 6,686 families residing in the CDP. The racial makeup of the CDP was 83.79% White, 10.60% African American, 0.61% Native American, 1.90% Asian, 0.04% Pacific Islander, 0.78% from other races, and 2.27% from two or more races. Hispanic or Latino of any race were 2.72% of the population.

There were 11,569 households, out of which 23.3% had children under the age of 18 living with them, 44.4% were married couples living together, 10.7% had a female householder with no husband present, and 42.2% were non-families. 32.7% of all households were made up of individuals, and 10.6% had someone living alone who was 65 years of age or older.  The average household size was 2.17 and the average family size was 2.77.

In the CDP, the population was spread out, with 18.3% under the age of 18, 13.9% from 18 to 24, 28.7% from 25 to 44, 21.5% from 45 to 64, and 17.6% who were 65 years of age or older.  The median age was 37 years. For every 100 females, there were 86.7 males.  For every 100 females age 18 and over, there were 84.3 males.

The median income for a household in the CDP was $38,674, and the median income for a family was $47,298. Males had a median income of $34,027 versus $23,892 for females. The per capita income for the CDP was $22,165.  About 7.7% of families and 12.1% of the population were below the poverty line, including 16.9% of those under age 18 and 7.1% of those age 65 or over.

Education
Ferry Pass is part of the Escambia County School District, which also serves the entire county. The University of West Florida is located in the northern part of the community.

References

External links
Ferry Pass profile from city-data.com
District 4 Town Hall in Ferry Pass - Escambia County

Pensacola metropolitan area
Census-designated places in Escambia County, Florida
Census-designated places in Florida